Tyrsenian can refer to:

Tyrsenians
Tyrsenian languages

See also

 
 Etruscan (disambiguation) aka Tyrsenian
 Etrurian (disambiguation) aka Tyrsenian
 Tyrrhenian (disambiguation) aka Tyrsenian

Language and nationality disambiguation pages